Hydrangea glaucescens, the Chinese hydrangea vine, is a species of flowering plant in the family Hydrangeaceae, native to southern China, Myanmar, and Vietnam. As its synonym Schizophragma integrifolium it has gained the Royal Horticultural Society's Award of Garden Merit.

References

glaucescens
Flora of South-Central China
Flora of Southeast China
Flora of Myanmar
Flora of Vietnam
Plants described in 2015